Luiz Antonio Ferreira Rodrigues (born 10 April 1994), known by his nickname Felipe, is a Brazilian footballer who plays for Goiás as a right back or a defensive midfielder.

Career statistics

Honours
Uniclinic
Campeonato Cearense Série C: 2014

Fortaleza
Campeonato Brasileiro Série B: 2018
Copa do Nordeste: 2019, 2022
Campeonato Cearense: 2016, 2019, 2020, 2021, 2022

References

External links

1994 births
Living people
Sportspeople from Ceará
Brazilian footballers
Association football defenders
Association football midfielders
Campeonato Brasileiro Série A players
Campeonato Brasileiro Série B players
Campeonato Brasileiro Série C players
FC Atlético Cearense players
Fortaleza Esporte Clube players